Pada may refer to:

Pada (film), an upcoming Indian film
Pada (foot), in Sanskrit grammar, and Hindu and Buddhist tradition
Sri Pada or Adam's Peak, a mountain in Sri Lanka
Pada, Estonia, village in Viru-Nigula Parish, Lääne-Viru County, Estonia
Pada river, see List of rivers of Estonia
Padar Island, sometimes known as Pada